In the Life of Music is a 2018 Cambodian drama film directed by Caylee So and Sok Visal. It was selected as the Cambodian entry for the Best International Feature Film at the 92nd Academy Awards, but it was not nominated.

Plot
Three generations are connected through the song "Champa Battambang" by Sinn Sisamouth.

Cast
 Ratanak Ben as Little Comrade
 Daniel Chea as Montha
 Socheat Chea as Samay
 Sreynan Chea as Phally
 Arn Chorn-Pond as Mith
 Ellen Wong as Hope
 Vandarith Phem as Chy

See also
 List of submissions to the 92nd Academy Awards for Best International Feature Film
 List of Cambodian submissions for the Academy Award for Best International Feature Film

References

External links
 

2018 films
2018 drama films
Cambodian drama films
Khmer-language films